Jacob Nena (10 October 1941 – 6 July 2022) was a Micronesian politician who served as the fourth President of the Federated States of Micronesia from 1996 to 1999. 

Nena was born in Lelu, Kosrae. He graduated with a BA from the College of Guam and later graduated with an MA degree from University of Hawaii at Manoa. He served as deputy district administrator of Kosrae from 1970 to 1977. He became the first elected Governor of Kosrae from 1979 to 1983.

Nena served as Vice President under Bailey Olter from 1991; after Olter suffered a stroke in July 1996, Nena took over as acting president on 8 November of that year and was sworn in as president on 8 May 1997, serving out the remaining two years of Olter's term.  
Nena died in Sacramento, California on 6 July 2022 at the age of 80.

References

External links 
 Official biography

1941 births
2022 deaths
Presidents of the Federated States of Micronesia
Vice presidents of the Federated States of Micronesia
Members of the Congress of the Federated States of Micronesia
Governors of Kosrae
People from Kosrae
University of Hawaiʻi at Mānoa alumni